The 2012–13 Kuwaiti Federation Cup is the 6th edition to be held and started on the 22 November 2012.

This edition will see all 14 teams play in one group, rather than the previous editions which have had two groups of 7 sides.

It is unclear at the moment if games are played on a home and away basis or if the team at the top after all games have been played will be crowned champions or if a final will be played.

Al Kuwait go into the competition as defending champions.

Standings

Results

Kuwait Federation Cup
2012–13 domestic association football cups
2012–13 in Kuwaiti football